Henning Nørgaard Wind (born 19 January 1937) is a retired Danish competitive sailor. He competed in the Finn class at the 1964 and 1968 Olympics and placed third and 18th, respectively. He served as the Olympic flag bearer for Denmark in 1964.

References

1937 births
Living people
Danish male sailors (sport)
Sailors at the 1964 Summer Olympics – Finn
Sailors at the 1968 Summer Olympics – Finn
Olympic sailors of Denmark
Olympic bronze medalists for Denmark
Olympic medalists in sailing
Hellerup Sejlklub sailors
Medalists at the 1964 Summer Olympics
Finn class world champions
World champions in sailing for Denmark
Sportspeople from Copenhagen